Dana Mann (née Beňušová, born September 6, 1984 in Bratislava) is a Slovak-born American slalom canoeist who competed at the international level from 2000 to 2015. She represented USA from 2013.

She won a gold medal in the K1 team event at the 2011 ICF Canoe Slalom World Championships in Bratislava. She also won three bronze medals in the K1 team event at the European Championships.

Dana is the older sister of Matej Beňuš, multiple world medalist and world cup champion in C1. She married the American K1 slalom paddler Scott Mann in 2010.

World Cup individual podiums

References

External links

Living people
Slovak female canoeists
1984 births
American female canoeists
Medalists at the ICF Canoe Slalom World Championships
21st-century American women
Sportspeople from Bratislava